Chamaesphecia minor is a moth of the family Sesiidae. It is found on Cyprus and in Turkey.

References

Moths described in 1856
Sesiidae
Insects of Turkey